Fleetlands is a heliport operated by Standard Aero located within Gosport, Hampshire, England.

History

In 1940 a Royal Naval Air Yard, RNAY Fleetlands, was opened here; it maintained naval fighters until helicopters became most popular within the Fleet Air Arm.

The control of Fleetlands was transferred to the newly formed Defence Aviation Repair Agency and the site became DARA Fleetlands which looked after all the helicopters within the British Armed Forces. During February 2008 the site was transferred to Vector Aerospace and renamed Fleetlands. Vector Aerospace has since been purchased by Standard Aero who now operate the site

Current use
The heliport is currently used by Standard Aero for use with their nearby maintenance, repair and overhaul facility.

See also
 RNAY Wroughton

References

External links
 
 Hampshire Airfields - Fleetlands

Heliports in England